Discoverer 25, also known as Corona 9017, was an American optical reconnaissance satellite which was launched in 1961. It was the fifth of ten Corona KH-2 satellites, based on the Agena-B.

The launch of Discoverer 25 occurred at 23:02 UTC on 16 June 1961. A Thor DM-21 Agena-B rocket was used, flying from Launch Complex 75-1-1 at the Vandenberg Air Force Base. Upon successfully reaching orbit, it was assigned the Harvard designation 1961 Xi 1.

Images were recorded onto  film, and returned in a Satellite Recovery Vehicle two days after launch. The Satellite Recovery Vehicle used by Discoverer 25 was SRV-510. Once its images had been returned, Discoverer 25's mission was complete, and it remained in orbit until it decayed on 12 July 1961.

The Satellite Recovery Vehicle was designed to be recovered in mid-air by a Fairchild C-119J Flying Boxcar aircraft. As SRV-510 descended, the C-119J was unable to capture it, and the capsule had to be recovered at sea after it landed. The film it returned was affected by streaks across images.

References

Spacecraft launched in 1961
Spacecraft which reentered in 1961